Jelf is a surname. Notable people with the surname include:

Arthur Richard Jelf (1837–1917), English judge
Ernest Arthur Jelf (1868–1949), writer and King's Remembrancer
Henry Jelf (1877–1944), English cricketer and Royal Navy officer
Richard William Jelf (1798–1871), British academic and academic administrator
Wilfrid Jelf (1880–1933), Canadian cricketer
William Edward Jelf (1811–1875), English churchman and academic

See also
Jelfs